Tachina tricincta is a species of fly in the genus Tachina of the family Tachinidae that is endemic to Austria.

References

Insects described in 1824
Diptera of Europe
Endemic fauna of Austria
tricincta